Sky High is a 1986 American adventure and comedy film directed and produced by Nico Mastorakis, and starring Daniel Hirsch, Clayton Norcross, Frank Schultz, Yvette Jarvis and John Lawrence. The film has music composed by Dennis Haines.

Cast
 Daniel Hirsch
 Clayton Norcross
 Frank Schultz
 Yvette Jarvis
 John Lawrence
 Danos Lygizos
 Jeff McGrail
 Kimon Mouzenidis
 Spyros Papafrantzis
 Julie Simone
 Nikos Skiadas
 Lauren Taylor

References

External links
 

1986 films
1980s adventure comedy films
American adventure comedy films
Films shot in Greece
1986 comedy films
Films directed by Nico Mastorakis
1980s English-language films
1980s American films